Christopher Livingston (born October 15, 2003) is an American college basketball player for the Kentucky Wildcats of the Southeastern Conference (SEC). He was a consensus five-star recruit in the class of 2022.

Early life and high school career
Livingston was born and raised in Akron, Ohio. He started playing competitive basketball at age five. As a freshman, he played for Buchtel Community Learning Center in Akron, averaging 24.7 points, 5.2 rebounds and 1.8 blocks per game. Livingston led his team to its first state final four appearance since 1997 and became the highest scoring freshman in school history. For his sophomore season, he transferred to Western Reserve Academy in Hudson, Ohio. In his season finale, Livingston recorded 50 points, 20 rebounds, eight steals and five blocks in a 76–65 win over Bristol High School. As a sophomore, he averaged 32.5 points, 12.4 rebounds, 3.2 assists, 2.9 steals and 1.4 blocks per game, earning MaxPreps Sophomore All-American first team honors.

For the 2020–2021 season, Livingston transferred back to Buchtel to play his junior year.

Recruiting
Livingston was a consensus five-star recruit and one of the top players in the 2022 class, according to major recruiting services. He held multiple college basketball scholarship offers before entering high school. Livingston was offered by Ohio State at age 14. On September 15, 2021, he committed to playing college basketball for Kentucky over offers from Georgetown and Tennessee State.

National team career
Livingston played for the United States at the 2019 FIBA Under-16 Americas Championship in Belém, Brazil. He led his team to the gold medal, recording 23 points, six rebounds and two assists in a 94–77 win over Canada in the final. Livingston was named tournament most valuable player and made the all-tournament team.

Personal life
Livingston has a twin brother, Cordell, who has been his high school basketball teammate at Oak Hill Academy, Buchtel, and Western Reserve Academy.

References

External links
Kentucky Wildcats bio
USA Basketball bio

2003 births
Living people
21st-century African-American sportspeople
African-American basketball players
American men's basketball players
American twins
Basketball players from Akron, Ohio
Kentucky Wildcats men's basketball players
McDonald's High School All-Americans
Small forwards
Twin sportspeople
Western Reserve Academy alumni